The Los Leones Dam is a tailings dam on Los Leones River, a tributary of Blanco River, about  northeast of Santiago, in Los Andes Province, Chile. The dam was constructed in segments between 1980 and 1999 and is now used only for emergencies. It is one of the tallest tailings dams in the world.

References

Dams in Chile
Mining in Chile
Buildings and structures in Valparaíso Region
Tailings dams
Dams completed in 1999
1999 establishments in Chile